This list of Utah State University alumni includes notable graduates, non-graduate former students, and current students of Utah State University (USU), a public, land-grant, research university located in Logan, Utah. This list does not contain the names of presidents or faculty of the university, unless they happen also to be alumni.

Founded in 1888 under the Morrill Land-Grant Colleges Act as the Agricultural College of Utah, USU has grown to more than 28,000 students. Although it is headquartered in Logan, USU operates throughout the state of Utah through five regional campuses and more than 20 distance education sites. On June 13, 1899, graduates of the Agricultural College of Utah met to create the Alumni Association. Today, the Alumni Association is located in the historic David B. Haight Alumni Center, which was dedicated July 11, 1991. Alumni chapters exist in Arizona, California, Colorado, Idaho, Nevada, Oregon, Utah, Washington, and Washington DC. USU boasts more than 180,000 alumni, who are found in every U.S. state and more than 100 countries.

Activism

Business

Education

Government and politics

Humanities and fine arts

Military

Religion

Science

Sports

Miscellaneous

References

 
Utah State University alumni
USU people